NZ Skeptics is a New Zealand incorporated society created in 1986, with the aim of promoting critical thinking. The main areas of interest to the NZ Skeptics are claims of psychic abilities, alternative medicine, creationism and other pseudoscientific claims. At its founding in 1986, it was known as the New Zealand Committee for the Scientific Investigation of Claims of the Paranormal (NZCSICOP). In 2007 the name was formally changed to NZ Skeptics Incorporated.

History

NZ Skeptics was co-founded (as the New Zealand Committee for the Scientific Investigation of Claims of the Paranormal) by David Marks, Denis Dutton, Bernard Howard, Gordon Hewitt, Jim Woolnough, Ray Carr and Kerry Chamberlain in 1986. Other similar organisations exist in the USA (Committee for Skeptical Inquiry), Australia (Australian Skeptics) and India (Indian CSICOP). Denis Dutton was the first chair. Vicki Hyde took over as the first chair-entity (a title devised by Hugh Young both to be all-inclusive and to parody inclusiveness) from 1997–2010. Gold (his only name), who founded the New Zealand Skeptics in the Pub, was chair-entity from 2010–2014. Mark Honeychurch was chairperson between 2014 and 2017. Craig Shearer is the current chairperson. Vicki Hyde continues in the society as a media spokesperson. The English spelling of the word "skeptic" was chosen over the British spelling "sceptic" to more closely associate with the American organisation, and to avoid negative connotations of "being cynical and negative". In 2007 the committee decided to formally change the name to NZ Skeptics Incorporated (NZSI).

The society does not address the topic of religion, not only because there are other organisations better equipped to deal with it, but also because religion is not testable unless the supporter makes a specific claim. The founders felt that people with religious beliefs could also be skeptical of claims of the paranormal and did not want to exclude them.

Due to a concern that the word "skeptic" was being confused by the public and media with respect to climate change NZSI made the following statement in 2014:

In 2015 NZSI adopted a new logo that incorporates a kiwi, koru and a question mark, and released a new website and journal.

In 1989 after its first conference NZI had 80 members; by 1999 there were over 500 members. Some notable skeptics such as James Randi, Richard Dawkins, Susan Blackmore, Ian Plimer and John Maddox had visited in that time.

Activities

NZ Skeptics holds an annual conference during the New Zealand summer. Conferences generally alternate between the three major New Zealand cities of Auckland, Wellington and Christchurch, with other cities hosting as and when there is sufficient interest.

NZ Skeptics produces a quarterly journal,The New Zealand Skeptic, which they send out to all members. The journal has been produced continuously since 1986, shortly after the society's inception.

On 30 January 2010, members in Christchurch participated in a mass overdose, a protest against the selling of homeopathic remedies in pharmacies. The protest was in line with similar activities held on the same day by the 10:23 campaign in the UK.

The first New Zealand SkeptiCamp was held at the Black Dog Brewery in Wellington.

Skeptics in the Pub events are held throughout New Zealand in Auckland, Hamilton, Palmerston North, Wellington, Christchurch and Dunedin.

Sue Nicholson

Sensing Murder psychic Sue Nicholson spoke at the 2013 Wellington conference about her 21 years of experiences as a psychic medium. Organiser Vicki Hyde applauded Nicholson's willingness to speak at the conference, saying "many people working in this profession are very reluctant to expose themselves to any critical scrutiny." Hyde is quick to add that "critical" in this case "involves a spirit of genuine interest and inquiry", even if proof of spirits from the after-life continues to be elusive.

Nicholson talked about her life history as a psychic for 18 minutes and opened up the lecture for questions. Despite being skeptical, the audience remained respectful and questioning.

Nicholson stated that her friends told her not to attend the conference, but she said, "I believe in healthy discussion, and we all have our opinions and that’s great. I’m not here to prove anything. I’m not here to convince you. We all have our thoughts, we all have our ideas and that’s how the world goes around."

3 News attended Nicholson's lecture and wrote, "But despite a colourful performance from Ms Nicholson, this lot remains unconvinced." Nicholson agreed to talk at the conference with the stipulation that the $500 speakers fee would be donated to a Women's Refuge."

The organisation has remained critical of psychics such as Nicholson. In 2018, NZ Skeptics denounced those who claim they can help locate missing persons, contacting families with information. Referring to one such case, NZ Skeptics Society chair Craig Shearer insisted those "grief vampires" never actually helped police solve a disappearance.

Controversy

In 1988 NZCSICOP member Trevor Reeves wrote a series of letters about psychic Shona Saxon and sent them to the editor of the Dunedin Star Midweek paper, to the Citizens Advice service, to the Dunedin police, and to social welfare. Saxon sued Reeves for malice, claiming embarrassment, humiliation and loss. According to Saxon, Reeves stated that she was "misleading people", "persuading people to go off their prescribed medications" and "upsetting disturbed people... on welfare benefits". The high court judge ruled in favor of Saxon. "[e]ssentially because he did not believe that Ms Saxon had deliberately set out to deceive clients". The judge held that Reeves' "statements were actuated by malice... by gratuitously attack[ing] Ms Saxon's personal integrity." Saxon was awarded a total of $12,000 damages, $6.000 against Reeves and $6000 against Allied Press Ltd. Reeves appealed to the High Court and the damages awarded against him were reduced to $4,500.

Because of the way the NZCSICOP public statements were worded, they were not a party to this action, and escaped what could have been a crippling penalty. The constitution provides suspension or expulsion of any member who brings the society into disrepute. Reeves left NZCSICOP shortly after the judgment was made. The case is recorded as Saxon v Reeves High Court Dunedin A39/87.

Dowsing

NZ Skeptics has been vocal in the fight against the government use of the pseudoscience of dowsing in New Zealand. The Carterton District Council uses dowsing to find underground pipes and cables despite the NZ Skeptics evidence that dowsing has been discredited. The Wellington City Council paid the Downer Group to use dowsing to find buried water pipes in early 2019. The City Council and a Downer Group representative both stated they were satisfied their work despite complaints by the NZ Skeptics. The Wellington City Council and the Downer Group were co-awarded the Bent Spoon Award for 2019.

Conferences

The annual NZ Skeptics Conference hosts a wide range of local and international speakers. The location usually alternates between Auckland, Wellington, Christchurch, Dunedin and Hamilton, but has also been held in Rotorua and Queenstown. In 2019, the conference was held at the Christchurch Arts Centre / Te Matatiki Toi Ora from 29 November to 1 December.

International guests have raised New Zealand's general awareness of skepticism. In July 1993 James Randi toured New Zealand, visiting Christchurch, Auckland and Wellington. "However, those unable to see him in person had plenty of opportunity to see him on TV, hear him on radio and read about him in newspapers and magazines. He was tireless in submitting himself to the punishing round of interviews, etc, arranged by our enthusiastic Media Representative. Every interviewer wanted to see him bend spoons, and he left behind him a trail of bent and broken cutlery, the bill for which was not negligible."

George Hrab travelled to the North Island on 1 December 2014, stopping over in Wellington for a special skeptics dinner event. Seating was limited to twelve, and tickets were auctioned in a blind auction on the NZ skeptic website.

Awards

A number of awards are presented at the annual conference dinner, notably the 'Bravo Award' for "critical thinking in the public arena", the 'Bent Spoon Award' for "the most gullible or naive reporting in the paranormal or pseudo-science area" and the 'Skeptic of the Year Award' (created in 2014). The name "Bent Spoon" is a reference to the psychic power claimed by Uri Geller.

Denis Dutton Skeptic of the Year Award

A founder of New Zealand Skeptics, Denis Dutton was a "thought-provoking, good-humoured and inspirational critical thinker" who the group decided to honour with a yearly prize... "to the skeptic who has had the most impact within New Zealand skepticism. The award comes with a year’s free membership to NZ Skeptics and $100 prize money." Other former recipients have included: Mark Hanna, Daniel Ryan, Siouxsie Wiles, Helen Petousis-Harris, Lance O’Sullivan, and Jessica Macfarlane.

Bravo Award
New Zealand Skeptics recognises "media professionals and those with a high public profile who have provided food for thought, critical analysis and important information on topics of relevance to our interests." According to co-founder Bernard Howard, the Bravo award was meant to be a "carrot" to journalists to reward and encourage good critical thinking in their reporting.

Bent Spoon Award

The Bent Spoon Award is "named in honour of Uri Geller". Throughout the year, selections are considered for the Bent Spoon award. Ideas are sent to the officers whom gather and retain all ideas until the committee reviews candidates. Those considered "truly ridiculous", along with selections from outside New Zealand, are not usually considered. Typically, a dozen nominees are selected and voted on by the executive officers. The announcement is usually made in the few weeks leading into the annual conference in order to "help boost interest". Candidates considered must be "important enough to deserve attention", people who "should know better", and be "wilfully misleading with intent to profit." According to Chair-entityship Vicki Hyde in 1996, the group saw an increase in calls from the media which begin with '"We don’t want to get the Bent Spoon so we thought we’d better check with you guys…"' It is gratifying to note that such calls have increased over the past four years."

Photo gallery

See also
 Homeopathy in New Zealand

References

External links
 NZ Skeptics

New Zealand sceptics
Skeptic organisations in New Zealand
Scientific skepticism
1986 establishments in New Zealand
Organizations established in 1986